Henk Ovink (born November 8, 1967, in Doetinchem, Netherlands) is a Dutch special envoy to the United Nations and flood expert. In 2015, he was appointed as the first Water Ambassador of the Netherlands.

References 

21st-century Dutch diplomats
Living people
1967 births